The Monchegorsk constituency (No.115) was a Russian legislative constituency in the Murmansk Oblast in 1993–2003. The constituency covered upstate Murmansk Oblast outside of Murmansk and Severomorsk. Due to declining population in Murmansk Oblast it lost one of the constituencies, which resulted in merger of Monchegorsk and Murmansk constituencies in 2003.

Members elected

Election results

1993

|-
! colspan=2 style="background-color:#E9E9E9;text-align:left;vertical-align:top;" |Candidate
! style="background-color:#E9E9E9;text-align:left;vertical-align:top;" |Party
! style="background-color:#E9E9E9;text-align:right;" |Votes
! style="background-color:#E9E9E9;text-align:right;" |%
|-
|style="background-color:#0085BE"|
|align=left|Vladimir Manannikov
|align=left|Choice of Russia
|
|14.23%
|-
|style="background-color:"|
|align=left|Viktor Ladan
|align=left|Independent
| -
|13.70%
|-
| colspan="5" style="background-color:#E9E9E9;"|
|- style="font-weight:bold"
| colspan="3" style="text-align:left;" | Total
| 
| 100%
|-
| colspan="5" style="background-color:#E9E9E9;"|
|- style="font-weight:bold"
| colspan="4" |Source:
|
|}

1995

|-
! colspan=2 style="background-color:#E9E9E9;text-align:left;vertical-align:top;" |Candidate
! style="background-color:#E9E9E9;text-align:left;vertical-align:top;" |Party
! style="background-color:#E9E9E9;text-align:right;" |Votes
! style="background-color:#E9E9E9;text-align:right;" |%
|-
|style="background-color:"|
|align=left|Lyudmila Pobedinskaya
|align=left|Our Home – Russia
|
|16.70%
|-
|style="background-color:"|
|align=left|Mikhail Antropov
|align=left|Communist Party
|
|14.45%
|-
|style="background-color:"|
|align=left|Natalya Lazareva
|align=left|Independent
|
|12.08%
|-
|style="background-color:#3A46CE"|
|align=left|Vladimir Manannikov (incumbent)
|align=left|Democratic Choice of Russia – United Democrats
|
|12.03%
|-
|style="background-color:"|
|align=left|Ivan Vishnyakov
|align=left|Kedr
|
|6.28%
|-
|style="background-color:"|
|align=left|Yury Sukhachev
|align=left|Independent
|
|5.92%
|-
|style="background-color:#3C3E42"|
|align=left|Andrey Matorin
|align=left|Duma-96
|
|4.51%
|-
|style="background-color:"|
|align=left|Vasily Kalaida
|align=left|Independent
|
|3.94%
|-
|style="background-color:"|
|align=left|Anatoly Shevchenko
|align=left|Independent
|
|3.70%
|-
|style="background-color:"|
|align=left|Konstantin Kolomiyets
|align=left|Independent
|
|2.06%
|-
|style="background-color:"|
|align=left|Vladimir Musatyan
|align=left|Independent
|
|1.16%
|-
|style="background-color:"|
|align=left|Mikhail Solovey
|align=left|Independent
|
|0.90%
|-
|style="background-color:#000000"|
|colspan=2 |against all
|
|14.59%
|-
| colspan="5" style="background-color:#E9E9E9;"|
|- style="font-weight:bold"
| colspan="3" style="text-align:left;" | Total
| 
| 100%
|-
| colspan="5" style="background-color:#E9E9E9;"|
|- style="font-weight:bold"
| colspan="4" |Source:
|
|}

1999

|-
! colspan=2 style="background-color:#E9E9E9;text-align:left;vertical-align:top;" |Candidate
! style="background-color:#E9E9E9;text-align:left;vertical-align:top;" |Party
! style="background-color:#E9E9E9;text-align:right;" |Votes
! style="background-color:#E9E9E9;text-align:right;" |%
|-
|style="background-color:"|
|align=left|Gennady Luzin
|align=left|Independent
|
|26.17%
|-
|style="background-color:"|
|align=left|Mikhail Antropov
|align=left|Communist Party
|
|17.40%
|-
|style="background-color:"|
|align=left|Boris Misnik
|align=left|Yabloko
|
|15.46%
|-
|style="background-color:"|
|align=left|Vladimir Veregin
|align=left|Independent
|
|15.18%
|-
|style="background-color:"|
|align=left|Lyudmila Pobedinskaya (incumbent)
|align=left|Our Home – Russia
|
|9.26%
|-
|style="background-color:#084284"|
|align=left|Natalya Gerivenko
|align=left|Spiritual Heritage
|
|2.94%
|-
|style="background-color:#000000"|
|colspan=2 |against all
|
|12.42%
|-
| colspan="5" style="background-color:#E9E9E9;"|
|- style="font-weight:bold"
| colspan="3" style="text-align:left;" | Total
| 
| 100%
|-
| colspan="5" style="background-color:#E9E9E9;"|
|- style="font-weight:bold"
| colspan="4" |Source:
|
|}

2000

|-
! colspan=2 style="background-color:#E9E9E9;text-align:left;vertical-align:top;" |Candidate
! style="background-color:#E9E9E9;text-align:left;vertical-align:top;" |Party
! style="background-color:#E9E9E9;text-align:right;" |Votes
! style="background-color:#E9E9E9;text-align:right;" |%
|-
|style="background-color:"|
|align=left|Igor Chernyshenko
|align=left|Independent
|
|45.08%
|-
|style="background-color:"|
|align=left|Boris Misnik
|align=left|Independent
|
|19.15%
|-
|style="background-color:"|
|align=left|Viktor Ladan
|align=left|Independent
|
|10.96%
|-
|style="background-color:"|
|align=left|Vladislav Shved
|align=left|Independent
|
|5.12%
|-
|style="background-color:"|
|align=left|Bogdan Khmelnitsky
|align=left|Independent
|
|3.89%
|-
|style="background-color:#000000"|
|colspan=2 |against all
|
|14.00%
|-
| colspan="5" style="background-color:#E9E9E9;"|
|- style="font-weight:bold"
| colspan="3" style="text-align:left;" | Total
| 
| 100%
|-
| colspan="5" style="background-color:#E9E9E9;"|
|- style="font-weight:bold"
| colspan="4" |Source:
|
|}

Notes

References

Obsolete Russian legislative constituencies
Politics of Murmansk Oblast